James W. Totman Stadium is a baseball venue in Riverside, California, United States. It is home to the California Baptist Lancers baseball team of the NCAA Division I Western Athletic Conference (WAC). The field's namesake is James W. Totman, a former local contractor.

History 
The field opened in 1991 and was remodeled in 2007, the field was constructed with seating areas, a scoreboard and dugouts, a press box and a backstop with netting.

Features 
The field's features include a natural grass playing surface with foul territory made of synthetic turf, a press box, an electronic scoreboard, dugouts, a brick backstop, restrooms, and concessions.

See also 
 List of NCAA Division I baseball venues

References

External links 
 Totman Stadium

Baseball venues in California
California Baptist Lancers baseball
California Baptist Lancers sports venues
College baseball venues in the United States
Sports venues in Riverside, California
Sports venues completed in 2007
2007 establishments in California